Evan Eugene Fraser (March 15, 1865 – August 4, 1949) was an Ontario contractor and political figure. He represented the provincial riding of Welland in the Legislative Assembly of Ontario from 1905 to 1914 as a Conservative member; and the federal riding of Welland in the House of Commons of Canada from 1918 to 1921 as a Unionist member.

The son of Alexander Fraser and Phoebe Upper, he was born in Allanburg, Canada West in 1865. and was educated in Thorold. In 1887, Fraser married Susie Hardie.

References

External links 
 

1865 births
1949 deaths
Progressive Conservative Party of Ontario MPPs
Unionist Party (Canada) MPs
Members of the House of Commons of Canada from Ontario